Miridiba is a genus of beetles in the family Scarabaeidae, which are known for their white larvae that feed on the roots of plants. The antennae end in a short club (shorter than the basal stalk). The mandible has a wrinkled molar lobe and the incisor lobe is depressed above. The labrum is depressed in the middle. Species within this genus are found in the Old World, mainly in eastern and tropical Asia. Many species in the genus were earlier placed in the genus Holotrichia.

Species

Subgenus Miridiba (s.s.)
 Miridiba abdominalis (Hope, 1831)
 Miridiba aequabilis (Bates, 1891)
 Miridiba bannaensis Gao & Fang, 2018
 Miridiba bengalensis (Brenske, 1894)
 Miridiba bidentata (Burmeister, 1855)
 Miridiba bilobata (Moser, 1913)
 Miridiba borneensis (Moser, 1918)
 Miridiba brancuccii (Sabatinelli, 1983)
 Miridiba brunneipennis (Moser, 1916)
 Miridiba castanea (Waterhouse, 1875)
 Miridiba ciliatipennis (Moser, 1913)
 Miridiba coromandeliana (Blanchard, 1851)
 Miridiba coxalis (Arrow, 1944)
 Miridiba diversiceps (Moser, 1912)
 Miridiba dohrni (Brenske, 1894)
 Miridiba excisa (Moser, 1913)
 Miridiba frontalis (Fairmaire, 1886)
 Miridiba furcillata Keith & Sabatinelli, 2010
 Miridiba gravida (Sharp, 1881)
 Miridiba gressitti (Frey, 1970)
 Miridiba hanoiensis (Keith, 2006)
 Miridiba herteli (Frey, 1971)
 Miridiba hirsuta Itoh, 2001
 Miridiba huesiotoi Li & Yang, 2015
 Miridiba hybrida (Moser, 1912)
 Miridiba imitatrix (Brenske, 1899)
 Miridiba koreana Niijima & Kinoshita, 1923
 Miridiba kuatunensis Gao & Fang, 2018
 Miridiba kuraruana Nomura, 1977
 Miridiba laosana (Moser, 1912)
 Miridiba leucophthalma (Wiedemann, 1819)
 Miridiba longula (Moser, 1912)
 Miridiba malaccensis (Moser, 1912)
 Miridiba newari (Sabatinelli & Migliaccio, 1982)
 Miridiba nigrescens (Moser, 1916)
 Miridiba obscura Itoh, 1995
 Miridiba pilosella (Moser, 1908)
 Miridiba pseudosinensis Keith, 2010
 Miridiba recta Keith & Sabatinelli, 2010
 Miridiba rugaticollis (Moser, 1913)
 Miridiba saigonensis (Moser, 1912)
 Miridiba schoolmeesteri Keith, 2010
 Miridiba scutata (Reitter, 1902)
 Miridiba siamensis Keith, 2004
 Miridiba sus (Moser, 1912)
 Miridiba taipei Li & Wang, 2015
 Miridiba taoi Li & Wang, 2015
 Miridiba thai Keith, 2010
 Miridiba trichophora (Fairmaire, 1891)
 Miridiba tuberculipennis (Moser, 1913)
 Miridiba vethi (Moser, 1914)
 Miridiba wangi (Li & Zhang, 1997)
 Miridiba waterstradti (Moser, 1912)
 Miridiba xingkei Gao & Fang, 2018
 Miridiba youweii Gao & Fang, 2018

Subgenus Pledina
 Miridiba axanensis Keith, 2020
 Miridiba enigmatica Keith, 2020
 Miridiba lamellata Gao & Fang, 2019
 Miridiba parasinensis Keith, 2020
 Miridiba quasisinensis Keith, 2020
 Miridiba sinensis (Hope, 1842)
 Miridiba sinensoides Keith, 2020

References 

Melolonthinae
Scarabaeidae genera